Ertrica is a genus of moths of the family Crambidae. It contains only one species, Ertrica purpurealis, which is found in Colombia.

References

Odontiinae
Crambidae genera
Taxa named by Francis Walker (entomologist)